Gymnopilus longipes is a species of mushroom in the family Hymenogastraceae.

See also

List of Gymnopilus species

External links
Gymnopilus longipes at Index Fungorum

longipes
Fungi of North America